Bebra is a river of Hesse, Germany. It flows into the Fulda near the town Bebra.

See also
List of rivers of Hesse

References

Rivers of Hesse
Rivers of Germany